Czyrna  {Lemko: Чирна}}, Chyrna) is a village in the administrative district of Gmina Krynica-Zdrój, within Nowy Sącz County, Lesser Poland Voivodeship, in southern Poland, close to the border with Slovakia.

References

Czyrna